Plevna is a city in Reno County, Kansas, United States.  As of the 2020 census, the population of the city was 85.

History
The first post office in Plevna was established in October 1877.

It is named after the historical city of Pleven in Bulgaria, which months before was a siege battle won by Russian/Bulgarian forces, gaining Bulgaria its independence.

Geography
Plevna is located at  (37.9722362, -98.3086791).

Demographics

2010 census
As of the census of 2010, there were 98 people, 43 households, and 29 families residing in the city. The racial makeup of the city was 91.8% White, 1.0% Native American, 5.1% from other races, and 2.0% from two or more races. Hispanic or Latino people of any race were 6.1% of the population.

There were 43 households, of which 23.3% had children under the age of 18 living with them, 39.5% were married couples living together, 18.6% had a female householder with no husband present, 9.3% had a male householder with no wife present, and 32.6% were non-families. 32.6% of all households were made up of individuals, and 13.9% had someone living alone who was 65 years of age or older. The average household size was 2.28 and the average family size was 2.83.

The median age in the city was 47 years. 25.5% of residents were under the age of 18; 4% were between the ages of 18 and 24; 19.4% were from 25 to 44; 28.6% were from 45 to 64; and 22.4% were 65 years of age or older. The gender makeup of the city was 43.9% male and 56.1% female.

2000 census

As of the census of 2000, there were 99 people, 46 households, and 28 families residing in the city. The racial makeup of the city was 96.97% White, and 3.03% from two or more races.

There were 46 households, out of which 23.9% had children under the age of 18 living with them, 50.0% were married couples living together, 2.2% had a female householder with no husband present, and 39.1% were non-families. 37.0% of all households were made up of individuals, and 19.6% had someone living alone who was 65 years of age or older. The average household size was 2.15 and the average family size was 2.75.

In the city, the population was spread out, with 22.2% under the age of 18, 6.1% from 18 to 24, 24.2% from 25 to 44, 25.3% from 45 to 64, and 22.2% who were 65 years of age or older. The median age was 44 years. For every 100 females, there were 90.4 males. For every 100 females age 18 and over, there were 108.1 males.

The median income for a household in the city was $26,875, and the median income for a family was $33,750. Males had a median income of $20,625 versus $25,417 for females. The per capita income for the city was $14,353. There were no families and 2.8% of the population living below the poverty line, including no under eighteens and none of those over 64.

Education
The community is served by Fairfield USD 310 public school district.  Before the creation of USD 310, the old Plevna High School mascot was the Tigers.

Notable people
 Karl C. King, member of U.S. House of Representatives from Pennsylvania

See also
 Ninnescah River

References

Further reading

External links

 Plevna - Directory of Public Officials
 Plevna city map, KDOT

Cities in Reno County, Kansas
Cities in Kansas
1877 establishments in Kansas
Populated places established in 1877